Expositiones terminorum legum Angliae (in French, translated into English, 1527; reprinted 1629, 1636, 1641, &c., as Les Termes de la Ley) is a book by John Rastell. It, and The Abbreviacion of Statutis (1519), are the best known of his legal works. Termes was also published under the title An Exposition of Certaine Difficult and Obscure Wordes and Termes of the Lawes of This Realme.

It is a law dictionary.

Lord Kenyon said that it is "a very excellent book".

Duke LJ. said that this book was "a work of very good authority and the application of the common law". He, and Atkin LJ, approved the definition of imprisonment contained in this book.

See also 4 Reeves 419 and 3 Dib Ames 90.

See also
Books of authority

References

External links
Les Termes de la Ley: or Certaine difficult and obscure Words and Termes of the Common Lawes and Statutes of this Realme now in use expounded and explained. London. 1636. Printed by the assignes of John More. Digital copy from Google Books.

Law dictionaries